Gerle is a surname. Notable people with the name include:

Andrew Gerle, American composer and pianist
Christophe Antoine Gerle (1736–c. 1801), French revolutionist
Elisabeth Gerle (born 1951), Swedish philosopher
Hans Gerle (c.1500–1570), German lutenist and arranger of the Renaissance
Rita Gerle, 18th-century Spanish textile worker

See also
Bánhidi Gerle, Hungarian sport aircraft (1930–1939)